Livia Azzariti (born 16 August 1954 in Rome) is an Italian physician and television personality.
She is host for the  Unomattina program, on Rai 1.

Life 
She graduated from the Sapienza University of Rome  in medicine. She in specialized in anesthesiology. In 1984 she began appearing on Rai when Luciano Rispoli recruited her for the medical program Colloqui sulla Prevention. Between 1985 and 1987, she was an editor for Enrica Bonaccorti 's program Ready, who plays?

She worked as a doctor of general medicine at Local health center RM 1.

In the 2013 Italian regional elections, she supported Nicola Zingaretti.

References 

1954 births
Living people
20th-century Italian physicians
Sapienza University of Rome alumni
Italian anesthesiologists
Women anesthesiologists
21st-century Italian physicians
Italian women physicians